The Monte Capio is a mountain in the Pennine Alps of north-western Italy; with an elevation of  is one of the highest peaks of the Alpi Cusiane.

Geography 

The mountain is located on the water divide between the valleys of the Strona and the Mastallone (the latter a side valley of Valsesia). The main ridge goes on southwards with Passo dei Rossi (2,056 m), a mountain pass dividing Monte Capio from the neighbouring Cima dei Rossi (2,134 m), while northwards the chain continues with Bocchetta di Rimella (1,924 m) and then with the Altemberg. Administratively the summit of Monte Capio is the tripoint where the borders of the comunes of Rimella (VC), Cravagliana (VC) and Valstrona (VB) meet. Close to the main elevation of the mountain stands a subsummit with a small cross and a metal bell. A sharp saddle connecting it with the actual summit is equipped with a metal cable, in order to facilitate the passage. A trigpoint of the IGM marks the main summit, where also stands a metal box with a register.

SOIUSA classification 
According to the SOIUSA (International Standardized Mountain Subdivision of the Alps) the mountain can be classified in the following way:
 main part = Western Alps
 major sector = North Western Alps
 section = Pennine Alps
 subsection = Southern Valsesia Alps
 supergroup = Alpi Cusiane
 group = Costiera Capio-Massa del Turlo
 code = I/B-9.IV-B.3

History 

On the eastern slopes of the mountain worked in the past a nikel mine, whose remains are still recognisable. In 2017 the local authorities autorised new mining prospectings aiming to search for presence of nickel, copper, platinum and gold minerals.

Access to the summit 

The summit of the Capio can be accessed starting from Campello Monti (a former autonomous comune now belonging to Valstrona), or following a longer foothpath from Sabbia, in Valsesia. The Monte Capio is quite a well known hiking destination because

Nature conservation 
The slopes of Monte Capio facing Valstrona are part of the regional park of Alta Val Sesia e dell'Alta Val Strona.

References

Mountains of the Alps
Mountains of Piedmont
Pennine Alps
Two-thousanders of Italy